Mystropomus is a genus of beetles in the family Carabidae, containing the following species:

 Mystropomus regularis Banninger, 1940
 Mystropomus subcostatus Chaudoir, 1848

References

Paussinae
Carabidae genera